Dim the Lights, Chill the Ham is the debut album by Canadian surf rock group Shadowy Men on a Shadowy Planet, released in 1991 through Cargo Records.

Track listing

Personnel 
Shadowy Men on a Shadowy Planet
Brian Connelly – guitar, keyboards
Reid Diamond – bass guitar
Don Pyle – drums
Production and additional personnel
Derek Von Essen – photography
Ormond Jobin – recording
Coyote Shivers – mixing, production

References

External links 
 

1991 debut albums
Shadowy Men on a Shadowy Planet albums
Cargo Records (Canada) albums
Albums produced by Coyote Shivers